Mette Munch (born 16 June 1966) is a Danish sailor. She competed in the women's 470 event at the 1988 Summer Olympics.

References

External links
 

1966 births
Living people
Danish female sailors (sport)
Olympic sailors of Denmark
Sailors at the 1988 Summer Olympics – 470
Sportspeople from Aarhus